Staub & Fantasie is the debut studio album by German recording artist Andreas Bourani, released by Vertigo Berlin on 10 June 2011 in German-speaking Europe.

Track listing

Charts

References

Andreas Bourani albums
2011 debut albums